Mark Smith (born 18 August 1981) is an English former professional rugby league footballer. He was signed by Swinton after captaining Widnes in National League One.

Career 
Smith played for the Wigan Warriors from the interchange bench in the 2003 Super League Grand Final which was lost to the Bradford Bulls.

Smith was captain of the Widnes Vikings side since the retirement of Terry O'Connor in 2006.

Career statistics

References

External links

(archived by web.archive.org) Profile at Widnes Vikings profile
 ĎŔƑ "My life in rugby league: Mark Smith" interview at TotalRL.com

1981 births
Living people
English rugby league players
Rugby league hookers
Rugby articles needing expert attention
Swinton Lions players
Widnes Vikings captains
Widnes Vikings players
Wigan Warriors players